Val di Zoldo is a comune (municipality) in the Province of Belluno in the Italian region Veneto.

It was established on 23 February 2016 by the merger of the municipalities of Forno di Zoldo and Zoldo Alto.

See also
 Cibiana Pass

References

Cities and towns in Veneto